Libero Tresoldi (21 January 1921 – 22 October 2009) was an Italian prelate, who was the bishop of Crema.

Born at Rivolta d'Adda, he later moved to Milan with his family.

Ordained a priest on 29 May 1943, Tresoldi was appointed auxiliary bishop of the Roman Catholic Archdiocese of Milan on 28 September 1970 and was ordained bishop on 22 November 1970. Bishop Tresoldi was appointed bishop of Crema on 10 December 1981 and retired on 11 July 1996.

He died in Milan in 2009.

Notes

1921 births
2009 deaths
Bishops of Crema
20th-century Italian Roman Catholic bishops
People from Rivolta d'Adda